The Yamaha OX77 is a naturally-aspirated, gasoline-powered, V8 racing engine, designed, developed, and built by Yamaha, for Formula 3000 racing categories, specifically the Japanese Formula 3000 Championship, between 1987 and 1988. It is a modified derivative and variant of the Ford-Cosworth DFV engine, but uses 5-valves per cylinder instead of four. This engine notably won the 1988 Japanese Formula 3000 Championship, being driven by Aguri Suzuki.

References

Super Formula
V8 engines
Gasoline engines by model
Engines by model
Yamaha products